Wat Suwan railway station is a railway station located in Maha Sawat Subdistrict, Phutthamonthon District, Nakhon Pathom.

Train services 
 Ordinary 251/252 Bang Sue Junction–Prachuap Khiri Khan–Bang Sue Junction
 Ordinary 254/255 Lang Suan–Thon Buri–Lang Suan
 Ordinary 257/258 Thon Buri–Nam Tok–Thon Buri
 Ordinary 259/260 Thon Buri–Nam Tok–Thon Buri
 Ordinary 261/262 Bangkok–Hua Hin–Bangkok
 Ordinary 351/352 Thon Buri–Ratchaburi–Thon Buri
 Commuter 355/356 Bangkok–Suphan Buri–Bangkok
 Rapid 178 Lang Suan–Thon Buri

References 
 
 

Railway stations in Thailand